Best Kept Secrets: The Best of Lamb 1996–2004 is the greatest hits collection of British trip hop group Lamb.

Track listing
 "Cotton Wool"
 "God Bless"
 "Gold"
 "Angelica"
 "Górecki"
 "Little Things"
 "B Line"
 "Lullaby"
 "Bonfire"
 "Heaven"
 "One"
 "Gabriel"
 "Til the Clouds Clear"
 "Wonder"
 "Please"
 "Stronger"

The pregap hidden track "Wonder (Instrumental Version)" can be found before the first track on the CD.

Charts

References

Lamb (band) albums
2004 greatest hits albums